The president of the National Assembly of Guinea is the presiding officer of that legislature. As of February 5, 2022, the National Assembly exists in the form of a National Transitional Council headed by former lawmaker Dansa Kurouma

Presidents of the Territorial Assembly

President of the Constituent Assembly

Presidents of the National Assembly (1974-1984: Popular Revolutionary Assembly)

References

Sources

National Assembly, Speakers
Guinea, National Assembly